Apleurus is a genus of cylindrical weevils in the beetle family Curculionidae. There are about eight described species in Apleurus.

Species
These eight species belong to the genus Apleurus:
 Apleurus albovestitus (Casey, 1891)
 Apleurus angularis (LeConte, 1859)
 Apleurus aztecus Anderson, 1987
 Apleurus hystrix (Fall, 1913)
 Apleurus jacobinus (Casey, 1891)
 Apleurus lutulentus (LeConte, 1859)
 Apleurus porosus (LeConte, 1876)
 Apleurus saginatus (Casey, 1891)

References

Further reading

External links

 

Lixinae
Articles created by Qbugbot